The Montour School District is a mid-sized, suburban public school district. The district serves Kennedy Township, Robinson Township, Ingram, Thornburg and Pennsbury Village, which are western suburbs of Pittsburgh, Pennsylvania, in the United States. The school district had a population of 24,711, according to the 2000 federal census. Special education was provided by the district and the Allegheny Intermediate Unit No. 3. Occupational training and adult education in various vocational and technical fields were provided by the district and the Parkway West Area Vocational-Technical School.

Extracurricular activities
The district offers a variety of clubs, activities and sports.

Athletics
Montour's athletic teams are called the Spartans and the school colors are black and athletic gold. The school currently offers American football, cross country, girls' tennis, golf, girls' volleyball and soccer in the fall; indoor track, swimming, wrestling, basketball, bowling, and ice hockey in the winter; and baseball, softball, boys' volleyball, boys' tennis, and track and field in the spring.

References

External links
 Montour School District

School districts in Allegheny County, Pennsylvania
Education in Pittsburgh area